Orford was a constituency of the House of Commons. Consisting of the town of Orford in Suffolk, it elected two Members of Parliament (MP) by the block vote version of the first past the post system of election until it was disenfranchised in 1832.

History
Orford was first represented in the Parliament of England in 1298, but did not regularly send members until 1529. The right of election was vested in the Mayor, eight portmen, twelve "capital burgesses" and the freemen of the borough. In the early days of its representation, Orford had been a prosperous port and its freemen were numerous, but by the 18th century the number of freemen was deliberately kept low to facilitate controlling the elections, and the town had become a pocket borough where most of the qualified voters consisted of the owner's family and retainers.

At one time Orford was owned by Viscount Hereford, but after his death in 1748 it was bought by the government, and by 1760, Orford was perhaps the most secure of all the "Treasury boroughs" – in other words boroughs where the influence of the Crown was so strong that the government could be sure of securing the election of whichever candidates they chose. As such, it was studied in detail by the historian Lewis Namier in his book Structure and Politics.

To secure government control, the treasury started packing the corporation with outsiders: Namier quotes a letter from John Roberts (who was managing the borough for the government) to Prime Minister Newcastle, urging an immediate decision on who should be nominated to a vacancy as capital burgess because otherwise "we shall be reduced to the necessity of chusing a townsman, the number of which it would be better not to encrease". Maintaining government control of the borough also involved considerable expenditure – £200 a year for rent of houses, and a further £100 for other expenses such as repairs and taxes, all met out of the secret service fund.

However, much of Viscount Hereford's estate had been bought by the Earl of Hertford, and he together with his brother Henry Seymour Conway, an influential minister, put pressure on successive Prime Ministers for the control of the borough to be given to him. Eventually in 1766, with the formation of Chatham's ministry, this pressure bore fruit, and Orford was transferred to the Earl of Hertford as partial compensation for his having been supplanted as Lord-Lieutenant of Ireland. From this point it remained under the control of Hertford and his heirs until it lost its representation 66 years later, and all its MPs were either members of the Seymour-Conway family or their friends.

By the time of the Great Reform Act in 1832, the population of the borough was only 1,302, in 246 houses, with about 22 men entitled to vote, and this was too small to justify its existence being retained.

Members of Parliament

MPs 1529–1660

MPs 1660–1832

Notes

References
J Holladay Philbin, "Parliamentary Representation 1832 – England and Wales" (New Haven: Yale University Press, 1965)

Parliamentary constituencies in Suffolk (historic)
Constituencies of the Parliament of the United Kingdom established in 1529
Constituencies of the Parliament of the United Kingdom disestablished in 1832
Rotten boroughs
Orford, Suffolk